The League of Jewish Women in Germany (JFB) was founded in 1904 by Bertha Pappenheim. Pappenheim led the JFB throughout the first twenty years of its existence, and remained active in it until her death in 1936. The JFB became increasingly popular through the 20th century. At its peak in 1928, the organization had 50,000 members from 34 local branches and 430 subsidiary groups. At the time, the JFB was Germany's third largest Jewish organization, with 15-20% of Jewish women in Germany becoming members.

Growth out of the Women's Movement 
The JFB followed the 1899 founding of the German Evangelical Women's Association, as well as the founding in 1903 of the German Catholic Women's Association. It was the part of the period of activity some call "First-wave feminism", in which women in some countries, including Germany, led movements aimed to increase women's rights. The foundation of the JFB shaped a distinct movement situated at the intersection of German society and Jewish tradition. From 1907 the JFB was a member of the Union of German Feminist Organizations (BDF), which had been developed as an umbrella organization for the various women's associations.

Goals and work 
The JFB was a community with a primary interest of improving women's experiences in the Jewish community. It was open about its desire to bring women into closer contact with Jewish tradition. Many members of the organization came from relatively assimilated Jewish families who had drifted far from tradition, and some were encouraged by their husbands to further conceal their Jewish identities. Some of these women reacted by developing a feminist practice of tzedakah, or the charitable giving mandated by Jewish law. The philanthropic contributions from local women's organizations supported centralized social outreach as well as the maintenance of relationships with international collaborators. This work led to the founding of the Central Office for the Welfare of Jews in Germany (ZWSt) in 1917.  The organization, particularly in its early years, focused on fighting for women's right to vote within the Jewish community.  The organization made combating antisemitism a main priority, even though it put less emphasis on the issue as many Jewish men's groups. The JFB provided social and educational resources for Jewish women and strove to end  what was defined as "female slavery", prostitution, and moral degradation in Germany and abroad. Pappenheim traveled to Eastern Europe on various occasions, which motivated her to push the organization toward combating prostitution and improving the lives of Jewish women in Eastern Europe. The JFB shifted its efforts away from helping Jewish women abroad at the outbreak of World War I. After World War I, JFB struggled to appeal to younger Jewish women, and mainly prioritized Jewish issues over feminist issues.

Role during World War I 
The JFB, like many other woman's organization in the BDF, mobilized to assist the war effort on the home front. The JFB collaborated with the Red Cross to provide first aid services on the home front as well as in military hospitals. The JFB also helped support wives and families of soldiers who died in the war.

Members 
 Rahel Straus
 Margarete Tietz

References

Further reading 
 Lara Daemmig and Marion Kaplan: Juedischer Frauenbund (The League of Jewish Women), Jewish Women's Archive, 
 Marion A. Kaplan: Jüdisches Bürgertum, Frau und Familie im Kaiserreich. Hamburg 1997, .
 Marion A. Kaplan: Die jüdische Frauenbewegung in Deutschland, Organisation und Ziele des Jüdischen Frauenbundes 1904–1938. Hamburg 1981, .
 Jutta Dick und Marina Sassenberg: Jüdische Frauen im 19. und 20. Jahrhundert. Lexikon zu Leben und Werk. Reinbek bei Hamburg 1993, .
 Inge Stephan (Hrsg.): Jüdische Kultur und Weiblichkeit in der Moderne. Köln, Weimar, Wien 1994, .
 Julius Carlebach (Hrsg.): Zur Geschichte der jüdischen Frau in Deutschland. Berlin 1993, .
 Arno Herzig: Jüdische Geschichte in Deutschland. Von den Anfängen bis zur Gegenwart. München 1997, .
 Yvonne Weissberg: Ein ethnisches Netzwerk. Der Jüdische Frauenbund in Köln 1933-1939. In: Ariadne. Forum für Frauen- und Geschlechtergeschichte. Heft 61 (Mai 2012), S. 40-47.
 Ariadne. Forum für Frauen und Geschlechtergeschichte (Hg.): „Jüdisch-sein, Frau-sein, Bund-sein“. Der Jüdischer Frauenbund 1904-2004. Heft 45-46 (Juni 2004).
 Gudrun Maierhof: Selbstbehauptung im Chaos. Frauen in der jüdischen Selbsthilfe 1933-1943. Frankfurt a.M. 2002.

External links 
 Lara Daemmig: Kampf um Gleichberechtigung: Der Jüdische Frauenbund in Berlin at HaGalil (in German)
 "Kochbuch für die jüdische Küche", digitized cookbook published by the League of Jewish Women at the Leo Baeck Institute, New York 

1904 establishments in Germany
Organizations established in 1904
1939 disestablishments in Germany
Organizations disestablished in 1939
Feminist organisations in Germany
Jewish Nazi German history
Social history of Germany
Jewish feminism
Jewish organisations based in Germany